The 1995 Missouri Tigers football team represented the University of Missouri during the 1995 NCAA Division I-A football season. They played their home games at Faurot Field in Columbia, Missouri.  They were members of the Big 8 Conference. The team was coached by second–year head coach Larry Smith.

Schedule

Coaching staff

References

Missouri
Missouri Tigers football seasons
Missouri Tigers football